The 2300 is a  inline-four engine produced by the Chevrolet division of General Motors for the 1971 to 1977 model years of the Chevrolet Vega and Chevrolet Monza. It featured a die-cast aluminum alloy cylinder block. The high-tech block features an alloy with 17 percent silicon. During the machining process, the cylinders were etched leaving the pure silicon particles exposed providing the piston wear surface, eliminating the need for iron cylinder liners. The block has cast iron main caps and a cast iron crankshaft. The engine's cylinder head is cast iron  for lower cost, structural integrity and longer camshaft bearing life. The valvetrain features a direct-acting single overhead camshaft design. The engine block and cylinder heads were cast at Massena Castings Plant in Massena, New York.

Overview

The tall, long-stroke motor's vibration tendencies are helped by large rubber engine mounts. One- and two-barrel carburated versions were offered. The engine used a  bore x stroke and 8.0:1 compression.

Overheating was a serious concern for the engine, since the engine block was of an open-deck design, severe overheating could cause the cylinder barrels to warp and pull away from the head gasket, causing coolant leaks into the cylinders and cylinder scuffing. Maintaining oil and coolant levels was crucial for the engine. The engine was equipped with an oil pressure switch which grounds out the primary-ignition system should the oil pressure fall below  during operation, thus stopping and preventing the engine from being restarted until the oil level was replenished or the mechanical cause of low-oil pressure was remedied.

The 1976 to 1977 the engine received a new cylinder-head design, incorporating hydraulic lifters to replace the taper-screw valve adjusters, improved coolant pathways, longer-life valve-stem seals, a redesigned water pump and thermostat, and a five-year,  engine warranty. The engine's name was changed to Dura-Built 140.

1975 to 1976 Pontiac Astre and 1975 to 1977 Chevrolet Monza had the Vega engine as standard equipment. Monza's H-body variants, the Pontiac Sunbird and Oldsmobile Starfire adopted Vega's revised Dura-built 140 engine, for 1976 and 1977 respectively.

The Cosworth Vega engine was produced in 1975 and 1976 using the 2300 engine block. The engine was de-stroked to  giving , with a 16-valve aluminum cylinder head, double overhead cams (DOHC), forged components and solid lifters.

Aluminum engine block

GM Research Labs had been working on a sleeveless aluminum block since the late '50s. The incentive was cost. Engineering out the four-cylinder's block liners would save $8 per unit — a substantial amount of money at the time. Reynolds Metal Co. developed a hypereutectic aluminum alloy called A-390, composed of 77 percent aluminum, 17 percent silicon, 4 percent copper, 1 percent iron, and traces of phosphorus, zinc, manganese, and titanium. The A-390 alloy was suitable for faster production diecasting which made the Vega block less expensive to manufacture than other aluminum engines. Sealed Power Corp. developed special chrome-plated piston rings for the engine that were blunted to prevent scuffing. Basic work had been done under Eudell Jackobson of GM engineering, but final production engineering work was finished by Chevrolet.

The Vega engine block was cast in Massena, New York, at the same factory that had produced the Chevrolet Turbo-Air 6 engine for the Corvair. Molten aluminum was transported from Reynolds and Alcoa reduction plants to the foundry, inside Thermos-like insulated tank trailers from the factory across the street. The block was cast using the ACCURAD process. Pure silicon provides a hard scuff and wear resistant surface, having a rating of 7 on the mohs scale of hardness, the same as quartz, as compared to diamond which is 10. The technical breakthroughs of the block lay in the precision die-casting method used to produce it, and in the silicon alloying which provided a compatible bore surface without liners. Before being shipped to Tonawanda, the blocks were impregnated with sodium silicate, where they were machined through the outer skin.
From Massena, the cast engine blocks were shipped as raw castings to Chevy's Tonawanda Engine plant in Tonawanda, New York. Here they underwent the messy etch and machining operations. The cylinder bores were rough and finish-honed conventionally to a  finish then etched by a then-new electro-chemical process.

Plating the piston skirts was necessary to put a hard iron skirt surface opposite the silicon of the block to prevent scuffing. The plating was a four layer electro-plating process. The first plate was a flash of zinc followed by a very thin flash of copper. The final layer was a flash of tin. The zinc and copper were necessary to adhere the iron while the tin prevented corrosion before assembly of the piston into the engine. Piston plating was done on a 46 operation automatic line. From Tonawanda, the engines went to the Chevrolet assembly plant in Lordstown, Ohio.

Eudell Jackobson of GM engineering pointed out one of the early problems with unexplained scuffing and discovered excessive pressure on the bore hones was causing the silicon to crack. This need to both develop and actually manufacture the engine was a product of the program schedule. He said, "...We were trying to put a product into production and learning the technology simultaneously. And the pressure becomes very, very great when that happens. The hone-pressure problem was solved before engines actually went out the door, affecting pre-production engines only."

See also
GM engines

References

Chevrolet engines
Straight-four engines
Gasoline engines by model